South College is a college of Durham University, which accepted its first students in autumn 2020. 

It is located in new buildings at Mount Oswald on Elvet Hill, to the south of Durham City, adjoining Van Mildert College and John Snow College.

History 

The site was originally part of the grounds of Mount Oswald, a country house built in 1800. In 1928, the house and grounds were converted to a golf club, which closed in 2014 and was acquired for residential development.

In August 2017, Durham University announced that it had acquired part of the site in order to build two Colleges, with construction to be carried out by a consortium led by Interserve. Construction began in September 2018, by which point it had been decided that these Colleges would be one new College, South College, and a new home for John Snow College (formerly located on the university's Queen's Campus in Stockton-on-Tees).

In November 2018, Interserve pulled out of the scheme, before going into administration in March 2019.

The college is anticipated to have an eventual size of 1,200, with 492 living in the college. All accommodation is self-catered, in a mixture of single en-suite rooms and 'town houses' with shared bathroom facilities.

In March 2018, it was announced that naming of the college would be delayed in the hope that a financial donation might be attracted. The temporary name "South College" was assigned pending selection of a final name, and was used in advertisements for the new college's first principal. In June 2019, Durham Students' Union assembly voted to lobby for the college to be named after the late politician and Durham graduate Mo Mowlam. On 1 April 2020, Durham's student newspaper Palatinate published an April Fools' Day joke that South College was to be named Vine College after broadcaster and Durham alumnus Jeremy Vine. Vine himself was in on the joke and even released a video of him reacting to the 'announcement'. 

On 5 July 2019 it was announced that University of Kent academic and former BBC editor Tim Luckhurst had been appointed as the first principal of the college.

In June 2020 a coat of arms for the College was announced, with the motto , which translates in English to "Freedom, Equality and Global Citizenship".

The first students arrived at the College in September 2020, during the COVID-19 pandemic.

2021 Rod Liddle controversy 

On 3 December 2021, Rod Liddle, a controversial columnist, was invited to a Christmas formal dinner at South College. The students were not informed that Liddle would be a guest speaker. In his speech, later referred to as a "tirade", Liddle made controversial statements about student sex workers, trans rights, the idea of institutional racism, and colonisation. Several students decided to walk out before or during Liddle's speech. South College's principal Tim Luckhurst called these students "pathetic" and that they "shouldn't be at university", and his wife Dorothy called one student an "arse". Luckhurst received criticism both for the decision to invite Liddle to speak at the Christmas dinner, and for his behaviour towards students during and after the speech. Durham University announced an investigation into the events at the formal which concluded in January 2022.

Buildings and Facilities 

The college accommodation blocks are named for articles linked to the Southern hemisphere, namely:
 Shipley (block B1) - named for former New Zealand president Jennifer Shipley.
 Gillard (block B2) - named for former Australian prime minister Julia Gillard.
 Concordia (block B3) 
 Scorpius (block B4) - named after the constellation Scorpius.
 Sirius (block B4) - named after the star Sirius.
 Centaurus (block B4) - named after the constellation Centaurus.
 Earhart (block B5) - named after aviator Amelia Earhart.
 Lorde (block B5) - named after the New Zealand singer-songwriter Lorde.

College facilities include a gym, MUGA (Multi-Use Games Area), library and study space, Café-Bar (colloquially known as "The Nest") and music room. Several facilities are shared with John Snow college.

Sports 

On 16 March 2022, South College received their first collegiate silverware, with South College LFC winning the 2021/22 Durham University Women’s Floodlit Cup as part of a joint team with Trevelyan College WAFC. The side beat Josephine Butler WFC 3-1 in the Final at Maiden Castle, with the match streamed on the Palatinate YouTube Channel.

Traditions 
South College has a carved wooden owl named Oswald, which is moved around the college to attend various events. He is present at the college matriculation of students, in which students pledge their allegiance to the college motto. At college formals, a toast is made to the owl, in which students shout 'to Oswald' and repeat the college motto.

Art installations 

 Conversation II by Nancy Frankel 
 Ephesus by Vadmin Kharchenko

List of Senior Leaders 

Principal:
 2019-present: Tim Luckhurst

Vice Principal:
 2019-present: Lee Worden

Assistant Principal:
 2019-present: Lynn Preston

JCR President:
 2019-present: Haf Serajee

Notes 
1.Officially recognised as Pantone 7648C by the South College JCR.

References

External links
 Official website

Colleges of Durham University
Educational institutions established in 2020
2020 establishments in England